Jean Delannoy (12 January 1908 – 18 June 2008) was a French actor, film editor, screenwriter and film director.

Biography
Although Delannoy was born in a Paris suburb, his family was from Haute-Normandie in the north of France. He was a Protestant, a descendant of Huguenots, some of whom fled the country during the French Wars of Religion, and settled first in Wallonia. Afterwards, their name became De la Noye and then Delano, who were on the second ship to immigrate to Plymouth, Massachusetts.

He was a student in Paris when he began acting in silent films. He eventually landed a job with Paramount Studios Parisian facilities, working his way up to head film editor. In 1934 he directed his first film and went on to a long career, both writing and directing. In 1946, his film about a Protestant minister titled La symphonie pastorale was awarded the Palme d'Or at the Cannes Film Festival. In 1960, his film, Maigret tend un piège was nominated for a BAFTA award for "Best Film from any Source". In recognition of his long service to the French motion picture industry, in 1986 Delannoy received an Honorary César Award.

Delannoy died on 18 June 2008, at the age of 100.

Partial filmography
 The Beautiful Sailor (1932)
 The Improvised Son  (1932)
 The Premature Father (1933) (editor)
 Paris-Deauville (1934)
 Casanova (1934)
 Women's Club (1936) (assistant director)
 Nitchevo (1936)
 Michel Strogoff (1936)
 Golden Venus (1938)
 The Black Diamond (1941)
 The Murderer is Afraid at Night (1942)
 (1939/1942)
L'Éternel retour (1943)
 Pastoral Symphony (1946)
Les jeux sont faits (1947)
 To the Eyes of Memory (1948)
 The Secret of Mayerling (1949)
 God Needs Men (1950)
La Minute de vérité (1952)
Napoleon Road (1953)
Destinées (1954)
Obsession (1954)
Marie-Antoinette reine de France (1956)
The Hunchback of Notre Dame (French title: Notre Dame de Paris) (1957)
Maigret tend un piège (1958)
Venere Imperiale (1963)
Les amitiés particulières (1964)
Le Lit a Deux Places (1965)
Le Majordome (1965)
Le Lit à deux places  (1966)
Les Sultans (1966)
Action Man (1967)
La Peau de torpedo (1970)
Pas folle la guêpe (1972)
Le Jeune Homme et le Lion (1976 television film)
Histoire du chevalier Des Grieux et de Manon Lescaut (1978 6-episode television series)
Les Grandes Conjurations : Le Coup d'État du 2 décembre (1979 episode of a television series)
L'Été indien (1980 television film)
Frère Martin (La justice de Dieu, La justice du Pape) (1981 television film in two parts)
Le Crime de Pierre Lacaze (1983 television film in two parts)
L'Énigmatique Monsieur S. ou Tout est dans la fin (1987 television film)
Bernadette (1987)
La Passion de Bernadette (1989 sequel to Bernadette that was only distributed in Lourdes)
Le Gorille compte ses abattis (1990 episode in the Le Gorille television series)
Marie de Nazareth (1995) released in English as Mary of Nazareth (2003)

References

External links
 
 

1908 births
2008 deaths
20th-century French male actors
César Honorary Award recipients
French centenarians
French film directors
French film editors
French Protestants
French male screenwriters
20th-century French screenwriters
French male silent film actors
French male non-fiction writers
Directors of Palme d'Or winners
20th-century French male writers
Men centenarians